The Parish Church of St. Helena is a historic Anglican church in Beaufort, South Carolina. Founded in 1712, it is among the oldest churches in the United States. Its building—erected in 1724 but expanded and substantially modified in the 19th century—is among the oldest continuously used church buildings in the United States. The church is a contributing property to the Beaufort Historic District, and the broader parish encompasses several sites listed on the National Register of Historic Places in Beaufort County.

History
An act of South Carolina Assembly established the Parish of St. Helena on June 17, 1712, just two years after the founding of Beaufort. In the town plan, land north of Duke Street was set aside as glebe land for the parish, and under colonial law the parish vestry had the power to tax and hold elections. The first minister was the Rev. William Guy, a missionary of the Society for the Propagation of the Gospel in Foreign Parts. However, construction on the first church was slow, with conflict between colonists and the Yamasee erupting into war in 1715. By the 1720s, £1,200 had been raised toward a church and parsonage, and construction was finished around 1724. In 1740, the parish added a chapel of ease on St. Helena Island for the convenience of planters there; the chapel remained until it burned in 1886, and its ruins are today listed separately on the National Register.

The church was expanded several times in subsequent years, with waves of reconstruction and renovation being completed in 1769 and 1842. St. Helena's Church experienced only minor damage during the Revolutionary War but suffered neglect following disestablishment until the 1820s. In 1823, the Rev. Joseph Walker began a 55-year rectorate. In 1831, St. Helena's was a hub for the Beaufort Revival late in the Second Great Awakening. The Rev. Daniel Baker, the minister at Independent Presbyterian Church in Savannah, was invited by Walker to preach at St. Helena's since there was no Presbyterian church yet in Beaufort. Baker preached two or three times daily at St. Helena's for ten days. William J. Grayson, a newspaper editor and future member of Congress who was converted during the revival, described the scene thus:

As a result of the revival, 40 men entered ordained ministry, six of whom became Episcopal bishops, including Stephen Elliott, the first bishop of Georgia, as well a future prominent Baptist minister, Richard Fuller. St. Helena's doubled in attendance and outgrew its building; Walker presided over a major expansion in 1842 that saw the addition of galleries in the church. During the Civil War, the church was used as a hospital.

In the early 21st century, as part of the Anglican realignment, St. Helena's Church remained affiliated with the Diocese of South Carolina when it disaffiliated from the Episcopal Church. After litigation, St. Helena's Church was one of the congregations permitted to keep its property, although the diocese was forced to rename itself as the Anglican Diocese of South Carolina. The congregation and diocese have been part of the Anglican Church in North America since 2015.

Architecture
St. Helena's Church is considered emblematic of colonial Georgian architecture, with its west facade representing the Federal style in particular. 

The church's prominent west end steeple was added in 1942 to a period design by Albert Simons. The church did not have a steeple between 1817 and 1942 and likely not before. An adjacent parish house was built in 1962.

Cemetery
The historic church sits in St. Helena's Old Church Yard, which was also dedicated in 1724. Notable interments in the cemetery include early Beaufort colonist John "Tuscarora Jack" Barnwell, his grandson and South Carolina militia general John Barnwell, and Confederate Army generals Richard H. Anderson and Stephen Elliott Jr..

Ministries
St. Helena's currently holds weekly services in the historic sanctuary, in the parish hall, on Fripp Island and at Habersham, a planned community west of Beaufort. Since 1925, St. Helena's has held an annual service at the NRHP-listed Old Sheldon Church ruins.

References

External links
 St. Helena's Church website

Anglican Church in North America church buildings in the United States
Religious organizations established in 1712
Churches completed in 1724
Historic district contributing properties in South Carolina
Churches in Beaufort County, South Carolina
Former Episcopal church buildings in South Carolina
Anglican realignment congregations
Multisite churches